Margaret Eliza Maltby (10 December 1860 – 3 May 1944) was an American physicist notable for measurement of high electrolytic resistances and conductivity of very dilute solutions. Maltby was the first woman to be awarded a Bachelors of Science (B.S.) degree from MIT, where she had to enroll as a "special" student, because the institution did not accept female students. Maltby was also the first woman to be awarded a PhD in Physics from the University of Göttingen in 1895.

Maltby was also a great advocate for physics, teaching physics courses specially tailored for non-physicists. She taught concepts such as the physics of music, in an attempt to show people that physics is exciting and open to everybody. During her 31 years career as Chair of the Physics department at Barnard College, Maltby focused heavily on her students' professional advancement.

Maltby was also Chair of the American Association of University Women (AAUW) Committee on Fellowships and she used her position to actively support women in engaging with physics and open doors to formal education paths.

Early life

Maltby was born on the family farm in Bristolville, Ohio on December 10, 1860 to Edmund Maltby and Lydia Jane Brockway. She had two older sisters: Betsy (Maltby) Mayhew and Martha Jane Maltby.

As an adult, Margaret Maltby recalled that she was interested in science as a young age—often questioning how nature worked—and that her parents encouraged her. They taught her how to use basic machinery, and her father especially supported her interest in mathematics. After Edmund's death, the Maltby family moved to Oberlin, Ohio for educational opportunities.

During her years at Oberlin College, Maltby also explored her interest in music. Music became a lifelong passion of hers, from enjoying classical music on the radio at her home to developing one of the first academic courses about the physics of music during her tenure at Columbia University.

Education
 A.B. Oberlin College 1882
 A.M. Oberlin College 1891
 B.S. Massachusetts Institute of Technology 1891
 Ph.D. University of Göttingen 1895 under Walther Hermann Nernst.

In 1887, Maltby enrolled at MIT and earned a B.S. degree in 1891. She was the first American woman allowed to take a graduate degree at the University of Göttingen in 1895. She was also the first woman to receive a Ph.D. in physics from Göttingen; in fact, she was the first woman to obtain a physics Ph.D. from any German university. After she received her doctorate she worked at the newly founded Institut für Physikalische Chemie at Göttingen under Walther Hermann Nernst. Invited back to Germany in 1898 to work at the Physikalisch-Technische Reichsanstalt in Charlottenburg, Maltby was research assistant to the President, Friedrich Kohlrausch, and helped set the research methodology in the field of conductivity. After returning to the United States, Maltby studied mathematical physics with Arthur Webster at Clark University from 1899 to 1900.

Career
 1889-93 Instructor, Physics Department, Wellesley College
 1893-96 Doctoral Student and Research Assistant, University of Göttingen
 1896-97 Associate Professor, Physics Department, Wellesley College 
 1897-98 Instructor of Mathematics and Physics, Lake Erie College
 1898-99 Research Assistant, Physikalisch-Technische Reichsanstalt, Charlottenburg, Germany
 1900-03 Instructor, Chemistry Department, Barnard College, Columbia University
 1903-10 Adjunct Professor, Physics Department, Barnard College
 1910-13 Assistant Professor, Barnard College
 1913-31 Associate Professor and Chair, Physics Department, Barnard College

Work
Most of her significant research occurred before she began teaching at Barnard College, a women's college founded in 1889, where her involvement in administration left her little time for research. Maltby was a mentor to her students, vigorously extending efforts to support their professional advancement. During her 31 years of teaching at Barnard, and the nearly 20 years that she was chair of the physics department, Maltby took a great interest in her students' learning, even introducing physics courses for non-physicists, including probably the first course in the physics of music.

There are many examples of her efforts to support the professional advancement of female physicists. As chair of the American Association of University Women (AAUW) Committee on Fellowships, Maltby administered funds that supported women actively engaged in physics research during the early part of their careers. Since women were not eligible for many research fellowships because of their gender, the AAUW Fellowships were critical for maintaining a cadre of women physicists. Maltby's enormous effort contributed to the Fellowships' preservation.

Despite Barnard College's Dean's Rule that stated,  "the College cannot afford to have women on the staff to whom the college work is secondary; the College is not willing to stamp with approval a woman to whom self-elected home duties can be secondary," Maltby supported women's efforts to do both. As chair of the Physics Department, she vigorously opposed the forced resignation of Harriet Brooks when she planned to marry.

Physicist and History of Science interviewer Katherine Sopka wrote that her students greatly admired her. One wrote her that, "Professor Maltby was my mentor--a gracious lady--a friend and a counselor. Her most memorable advice to me was not to forego marriage for a career--which advice I followed and lived happily ever after."  Maltby never married.

The first edition of American Men of Science, published in 1906, recognized her name with star to note her as one of the country's top scientists.

Publications

Scientific publications 
 "Methode zur Bestimmung grosser elektrolytischer Widerstände," Zeitschrift für Physikalische Chemie 18:133-158 (1895).
"Methode zur Bestimmung der Periode electrischer Schwingungen," AnPhCh 61: 553 (1897).
 "Das elektrische Leitvermögen wässriger Lösungen von Alkali-Chloriden und Nitraten," in Wissenschaftliche Abhandlungen der Physikalisch-Technischen Reichsanstalt. Vol. 3: 156 (1900) with F. Kohlrausch.

Publications on education 
"A Few Points of Comparison between German and American Universities," PAColA 2ds. 62: 1 (1896).
"The Relation of Physics and Chemistry to the College Science Courses," Columbia Quarterly 18: 56 (Dec. 1915).
"The Physicist," in Careers for Women, Catherine Filene, ed. (Boston: Riverside Press, 1920): 430-433.
"History of Fellowships Awarded by the American Association of University Women, 1888-1929". New York: Columbia University Press, 1929.

Honors
 First woman to receive a Ph.D. in physics from Göttingen University, 1895
 American Association of University Women European Fellow, 1895–96
 Fellow American Association for the Advancement of Science, 1889
 Fellow American Physical Society, 1900
 Appeared in first seven editions of American Men of Science, 1906
 Margaret E. Maltby Fellowship established by the American Association of University Women, 1926

Personal life
"Maltby herself never married but nevertheless enjoyed some of the pleasures of motherhood and grandmotherhood through the adoption in 1901 of the orphaned son of a close friend."—Katherine Sopka.

The quote above was the polite fiction accepted by Maltby's friends and associates in the academic world of Barnard College and Columbia University in the first half of the 20th century.

And fiction it was.

Autosomal DNA tests of Margaret Maltby's "adopted" son's two daughters, available at Ancestry.com., show their descent from ancestral families of Maltby's mother and of her father, evident in the DNA his daughters share with numerous other descendants of those families.  It is clear that Philip Randolph Meyer was Maltby's natural son. He was born in June 1897, six months after Maltby's sudden resignation at the end of the Fall 1896 term "in consequence of an accident" from her post as Associate Professor of Physics at Wellesley College.

Maltby reappeared to resume her teaching career as an instructor at Lake Erie College in September 1897.  She returned to a research position in Germany in 1898, leaving her son in the care of a friend with a well fitted-out nursery.  Upon her return to the United States in 1901, she was reunited with her son.  She took up her post at Barnard College that same year.

She spent the rest of her life in the Columbia University Morningside Heights community except for a year's sabbatical at the Cavendish Laboratory, Cambridge University, in 1910, a short-lived attempt to relocate to California for her retirement, and frequent and extensive traveling and touring.

Death
Maltby died on May 3, 1944 at the Columbia-Presbyterian Medical Center in New York City.

References

Bibliography

Further reading

1860 births
1944 deaths
American women physicists
Wellesley College faculty
Barnard College faculty
University of Göttingen alumni
19th-century American physicists
20th-century American physicists
19th-century American women scientists
20th-century American women scientists
American women academics
19th-century women physicists
20th-century women physicists